Bratovo is a village in Northern Bulgaria. The village is located in Targovishte Municipality, Targovishte Province. Аccording to the numbers provided by the 2020 Bulgarian census, Bratovo currently has a population of 243 people with a permanent address registered in the settlement.

Geography 
The village lies between two geographical areas - the Balkan Mountains and the Danubian Plain (Bulgaria).

Bratovo village is located in Municipality Targovishte, 10 kilometers northeast away from Targovishte.

The village's elevation ranges between 300 and 499 meters with an average elevation of 479 meters above sea level. The climate is continental.

Infrastructure 
In 2019, Targovishte Municipality invested in the restoration of the village's ritual hall.

Buildings 

 There is a kindergarten in the village.
 There is a local community center and library “Prosveta”. It is still active.
 There used to be an elementary school “Sv. Sv. Kiril i Metodii” but it was closed in 1997.

Ethnicity 
According to the Bulgarian population census in 2011.

References 

Villages in Targovishte Province